The 1979 South African Grand Prix (formally the XXV Simba Grand Prix of South Africa) was a Formula One motor race held on 3 March 1979 at Kyalami. The race, contested over 78 laps, was the third race of the 1979 Formula One season and was won by Gilles Villeneuve, driving a Ferrari. Teammate and local driver Jody Scheckter finished second, while Jean-Pierre Jarier finished third in a Tyrrell-Ford.

Qualifying

Qualifying classification

Race

Classification

Championship standings after the race

Drivers' Championship standings

Constructors' Championship standings

Note: Only the top five positions are included for both sets of standings.

References

South African Grand Prix
Grand Prix
South African Grand Prix
March 1979 sports events in Africa